Tiger Zinda Hai is a 2017 Indian Hindi-language spy action-thriller film written and directed by Ali Abbas Zafar from a story by Zafar and Neelesh Misra; produced by Aditya Chopra under Yash Raj Films. The film is the sequel to Ek Tha Tiger (2012) and the second installment in the YRF Spy Universe. The film stars Salman Khan and Katrina Kaif reprising their roles from the predecessor alongside Sajjad Delafrooz, Angad Bedi, Kumud Mishra, Nawab Shah, Ivan Rodrigues, Girish Karnad and Paresh Rawal. In Tiger Zinda Hai, Avinash "Tiger" Singh Rathore (Khan) and Zoya Humaini-Rathore (Kaif) must come out of hiding to save hostages held by a militant terrorist organisation in Iraq.

A sequel was conceived following the success of the Ek Tha Tiger, but faced a number of delays after the writer and director of the first film, Kabir Khan, refused to return for a sequel; Zafar was subsequently hired to write and direct, and the film's story draws inspiration from the 2014 abduction of Indian nurses by ISIL. By 2016, pre-production had begun on the film, and filming concluded by 2017, with filming locations including Abu Dhabi, Austria, Greece, and Morocco. With a budget of  it was one of the most expensive Hindi films ever made at time of its release.

Tiger Zinda Hai was theatrically released worldwide by Yash Raj Films on 22 December 2017. It received generally positive reviews from critics for its action sequences and cast performances. Like its predecessor, it set numerous box-office records during its theatrical run, grossing over  worldwide, becoming the 14th highest-grossing Indian film. At the 63rd Filmfare Awards, Tiger Zinda Hai won for Best Action. The third installment in the franchise, Tiger 3 is slated to release on Diwali 2023.

Plot 
 
In Iraq, an American journalist is killed by the ISC, a terrorist organization, while attempting to report their recent activities to the CIA. During a rally in Tikrit, their leader, Abu Usman, is shot by the Iraqi Army and is taken to the local hospital, which also serves as a training center for Indian and Pakistani nurses. Usman orders a heightened ISC presence around him for security, causing the CIA to prepare an airstrike on the hospital. During this, Maria, an Indian nurse, secretly calls the Indian Ambassador to Iraq and informs him about Indian and Pakistani nurses being held hostage; the CIA tells RAW chief Shenoy that he has seven days to rescue the nurses before the airstrike is ordered.

Former spies Avinash Singh "Tiger" Rathore and Zoya Humaini-Rathore, now married with a son, live in hiding in Innsbruck. Shenoy and Karan Rao, a RAW agent, locate and inform Tiger and Zoya of the hostages; despite initial reluctance, Tiger accepts after Zoya's insistence. Tiger goes to Syria with his select team of RAW agents: Azaan, an expert sniper, Namit, a bomb disposal expert, and Rakesh, a hacker. They travel to Iraq posing as illegal migrant workers for an oil refinery run by Tohbaan, an Indian sympathizer to the ISC, and Amir Baghdawi, Usman's second-in-command. Tiger then meets Pawan, his handler, in Tikrit to gather supplies, however, they are forced to rescue Hassan, a child suicide bomber sent by Usman.

Pawan is shot by the ISC in the ensuing fallout and Tiger narrowly escapes with the unexpected arrival of Zoya. The couple decides that ISI and RAW should work together to save the nurses. Later that night, Tiger and his team set a controlled explosion in the refinery and fake burns so they are taken to the hospital. Tiger gets Tohbaan to reveal he is actually Firdaus, an undercover RAW agent tasked by Shenoy to spy on Tiger and his team. Tiger and Zoya agree to simultaneous, coordinated attacks against the ISC. Zoya goes undercover and is eventually recruited by Baghdawi, who keeps female slaves. On the day of the airstrike, she manages to kill Baghdawi. At the hospital, Rakesh poisons food the migrant workers are tasked to cook for the ISC.

Tiger's crew eventually succeeds in eliminating the majority of the ISC armies, but Azaan dies in the conflict. Tiger finds Zoya captured by Usman in the boiler room and surrenders. Tiger is initially tortured but stabs Usman (who manages to escape) and tries to free Zoya while the nurses are rescued by RAW and ISI. Firdaus eventually kills Usman as the hospital is blown up in the American airstrike. A year later, on 15 August, Shenoy is called by Tiger from Greece. Having adopted Hassan, Tiger informs him his family has returned to hiding, knowing that RAW and ISI would not leave them in peace. However, he assures Shenoy that he will be there for his country if they need him.

Cast 

 Salman Khan as Avinash Singh "Tiger" Rathore, a former RAW agent in hiding with his wife, Zoya
 Katrina Kaif as Zoya, an ISI agent in hiding with her husband, Tiger
 Sajjad Delafrooz as Abu Usman, the leader of the ISC, an Iraqi terrorist group
 Girish Karnad as Shenoy, the chief of RAW.
 Paresh Rawal as Firdaus, an undercover RAW agent from Saharanpur, U.P posing as an ISC sympathiser, Tohbaan
 Kumud Mishra as Rakesh Prasad Chaurasia, a hacker for RAW
 Angad Bedi as Namit Khanna, a RAW agent who is a bombs expert
 Paresh Pahuja as Azaan Akbar, a sniper for RAW
 Anant Vidhaat Sharma as Karan Rao, Shenoy's assistant in RAW
 Gavie Chahal as Captain Abrar, an ISI agent
 Danish Bhatt as Captain Javed, an ISI agent
 Anupriya Goenka as Poorna, a hostage nurse
 Neha Hinge as Maria, a hostage nurse
 Kashmira Irani as Sana, a hostage nurse
 Nawab Shah as Pawan, an undercover RAW agent and Tiger's handler in Iraq
 Sal Yusuf as Amir Al-Baghdawi, an ISC member and Usman's second-in-command.
 Sartaaj Kakkar as Junior, Tiger and Zoya's son
 Jineet Rath as Hassan, Tiger's adopted child from Iraq
 Ivan Rodrigues as India's Ambassador to Iraq
 Siddhartha Basu as Indian External Affairs Minister

Production 
Filming took place in Abu Dhabi, Austria, Greece and Morocco. The last song of the movie was shot in the Aegean island of Naxos, Greece in October 2017. Iranian actor Sajjad Delafrooz was roped in to play the role of Abu Usman, leader of terrorist organisation ISC. Sajjad Delafrooz had worked in the 2015 Hindi film Baby.

The film's budget was reportedly .

Marketing and release 
The film's trailer was released on 6 November 2017. Within 24 hours, it broke many records for Hindi film trailers on YouTube, with more than 29 million views, 480 thousand likes and 250 thousand shares. On 11 November, it became the most liked film trailer on YouTube with 700 thousand likes, surpassing Star Wars: The Force Awakens (2015) then. The record was later surpassed by the trailer of Avengers: Infinity War (2018) with about 2 million likes.

The film was released on 22 December 2017 worldwide. The film received a U/A certificate from Central Board of Film Certification. Despite having a song featuring Pakistani singer Atif Aslam, the film has not been given No-Objection Certificate by Central Board of Film Censors in Pakistan, stating the reason as was said for Ek Tha Tiger that "The image of Pakistan and its law enforcement agencies" have been compromised.

Tiger Zinda Hai was in controversy on its release and faced protests from the Valmiki community, when Salman Khan allegedly made a casteist slur, where he compared his dancing skills to a sanitation worker, "or "bhangi" in a dance show. Shilpa Shetty also laughed along with him, and said that she also looked like one. Valmiki group is made up of a cluster of dalit communities — a few of whom are Bhangi, Mehtar, Chuhra, Lal Beghi and Halalkhor. Valmiki community filed a legal case against both actors for hurting their sentiments.

Maharashtra Navnirman Sena also unsuccessfully protested urging Mumbai multiplexes to promote Marathi film Deva instead of Tiger Zinda Hai. Their leaders raised issue about the loss of screens to Marathi films like Deva and Ek Atrangi which released alongside.

Reception

Critical response 
Tiger Zinda Hai opened to mostly positive reviews.  Taran Adarsh of Bollywood Hungama gave 4.5 stars, and said "Salman is the lifeline, the real treasure of Tiger Zinda Hai. He sinks his teeth into the character and, in several sequences, peels off the mask of super-stardom and brings the actor to the fore. Katrina is in solid form, in action sequences specifically commands attention." Umesh Punwani of Koimoi gave 4 stars, and said "Katrina Kaif is brilliant! She has very few dialogues, and no, that's not the reason she's good. Working amazingly well with her expressions, she has turned into an athlete for this one. Performing a few major action sequences, she is flawless." Aarti Jhurani of The National gave 4 stars, and said, "While logic is not a very important factor in Khan's films, emotions certainly are, and the director made sure to hit all the soft spots – from patriotism to Indo-Pakistan bonding to a multitude of cheesy dialogues – which is a smart move, and sure to bring in both Indian and Pakistani audiences." Lasyapriya Sundaram of The Times of India gave 3.5 stars, and said "The film is visually stunning in parts and Salman Khan plays Tiger with roaring confidence and dialogues packed with punch. Of course, his fans get a true-blue Salman Khan moment when he bares his torso." Rachit Gupta of Filmfare gave 3.5 stars, and said "It may look like a Hollywood action thriller, but at its heart, Tiger Zinda Hai is an unabashed masala movie. The heady mixture of an international looking action film and the regular tropes of Hindi cinema make it a pleasing watch."

Rohit Bhatnagar of Deccan Chronicle gave 3 stars and said, "Ali Abbas Zafar smoothly takes Ek Tha Tiger franchise ahead by telling a real story and inserting a whole lot of drama and thrill. The film also touches upon relationships between India and Pakistan but subtly. The biggest hiccup of the film is its length." Rajeev Masand of News 18 gave 3 stars, and said "The film has some thrilling action, while logic and subtlety are sacrificed at the altar of spectacle and sentiment. Katrina gets some terrific action moments, and she executes them well, but make no mistake, the heavy lifting here is left to Salman Khan, and he's clearly up for the challenge." Richa Barua of Asianet News gave the film a rating of 4.5 stars, and states that the film "keeps you glued to the seats."

Raja Sen of NDTV India gave 2.5 stars, and said "Tiger Zinda Hai breaks for intermission at a point when most self-respecting action films would have rushed into the climax. Long before the finish eventually rolled around, I found myself wishing Tiger would croak just so I could make it out alive." Rohit Vats of Hindustan Times gave 2.5 stars, and said, "It's better for the filmmakers to set a character trajectory that matches the star's current image rather than basking in the glory of the past." Anna M. M. Vetticad of Firstpost gave 2.5 stars, stating that both Salman Khan and Katrina Kaif delivered fun with equal parts swag, silliness and schmaltz. Shubhra Gupta of Indian Express gave 2.5 stars, and said "Only once in a while, the film gives in and provides us with a killing which sobers us up, but very quickly it's back to the base, with Bhai taking over, and everyone including Nurse Poorna and Zoya making way for him. But you can see she enjoys kicking butt: you wish she had more to do." Anupama Chopra of Film Companion wrote, "Tiger Zinda Hai is fun in bits and spurts, but there isn’t enough buoyancy to make it a slam dunk."

Box office

India 
Tiger Zinda Hai made a new non-holiday record in India as it collected 34.1crore nett on its first day. It went on to collect ₹35.30 crore nett gross on second day. The film recorded the second highest day of all time (after third day of Bahubali 2: The Conclusion's Hindi-dub) on its third day with nett of ₹45.53 crore and the highest ever for the Hindi film industry. With three day nett collections of over ₹1.14 billion, Tiger Zinda Hai had the second highest opening weekend of all time (after Bahubali 2: The Conclusion) and the highest opening weekend of all time in the Hindi film industry. Tiger Zinda Hai netted Rs 154 crore in its first four days in India.

Other territories 
Tiger Zinda Hai grossed $2 million in two days, $450,000 on day one in US/Canada and around £150,000 in the UK. The film grossed $7 million in its opening weekend in overseas, including  $2,535,825 in US/Canada. The film grossed 190crore worldwide in its opening weekend. In the United Kingdom, it grossed  in 2017, making it the year's highest-grossing foreign-language film in the UK (above Baahubali 2 in second place).

As of 25 February 2018, the film has grossed US$87.32million (569crore) worldwide, including 434.82crore (US$67.11million) in India, and US$20.3million (128.9crore) overseas.

Music 

The music of the film is composed by Vishal–Shekhar while lyrics are penned by Irshad Kamil. The background score is composed by Julius Packiam. The first song of the film is titled as Swag Se Swagat which is sung by Vishal Dadlani and Neha Bhasin and produced by Meghdeep Bose released on 19 November 2017. It has become the most-liked Bollywood song on YouTube and the fastest Bollywood song to cross 100million views on YouTube. The second song of the film, Dil Diyan Gallan, which is sung by Atif Aslam, was released by Salman Khan and Katrina Kaif at Big Boss Season 11 on 26 November 2017. It is the song of the decade, Beautifully sung by Atif Aslam. The album was released on 7 December 2017 by YRF Music. The Arabic version of "Swag Se Swagat" was sung by Rabih Baroud and Brigitte Yaghi.

By 8 February 2018, the album had crossed 1billion streams on music streaming platforms. As of 13 April 2019, songs from the album have over 1.5billion views combined on YouTube, making it the most-streamed Bollywood soundtrack album on the platform.

Accolades

Sequel 
A sequel to the film is in the works and is reported to be directed by Maneesh Sharma. Emraan Hashmi is said to be playing the antagonist in the film, with Salman Khan and Katrina Kaif reprising their roles. Aditya Chopra and Shridhar Raghavan are said to write the film. YRF is developing a Spy Universe which consists of Salman Khan as Tiger, Shah Rukh Khan as Pathaan and Hrithik Roshan as Kabir.

Notes

References

External links 

 
 
 Tiger Zinda Hai at Bollywood Hungama

2010s Hindi-language films
2017 action thriller films
India–Pakistan relations in popular culture
Films about the Research and Analysis Wing
2010s action adventure films
Indian action thriller films
Films shot in Austria
Films about terrorism in India
Yash Raj Films films
Indian action adventure films
Films about nuclear war and weapons
Films shot in Morocco
Films shot in Abu Dhabi
Films shot in Greece
Girls with guns films
Films directed by Ali Abbas Zafar
Film censorship in Pakistan
Film controversies in Pakistan
Films about Islamic State of Iraq and the Levant
Films about jihadism
Films set in Iraq
Films set in Baghdad
Indian spy thriller films
Iraq War films